Dick Wright may refer to:

 Dick Wright (baseball) (1890–1952), baseball player
 Dick Wright (footballer, born 1931) (1931–2003), footballer for Chester City
 Dick Wright (Australian footballer) (1902–1961), Australian rules footballer

See also 
 Richard Wright (disambiguation)